Rachael Anne Lynch  (born 2 July 1986) is a field hockey player from Australia.

Personal life
Rachael Lynch was born and raised in Warrandyte, a suburb of Melbourne.

She works as a nurse in neuro-rehabilitation at the Fiona Stanley Hospital in Perth, and previously worked at the Royal Perth Hospital.

Career

Domestic leagues

Australian Hockey League
Prior to the disbandment of the Australian Hockey League (AHL), Lynch was a member of the Victorian Vipers. Throughout her career with the team, Lynch won the national title on two occasions, in 2012 and 2017.

Hockey One
After the introduction of the Hockey One League in 2019, Lynch was named as a member of the HC Melbourne team in the inaugural tournament. The team finished second, losing the final in penalties.

Hockeyroos
Lynch made her senior international debut for the Hockeyroos in 2006, in a test match against England. She won a silver medal with the team in 2009 at the Champions Trophy in Sydney.

Lynch has medalled three times at Commonwealth Games, winning gold in 2010 and 2014, as well as silver in 2018. She also medalled at five consecutive Oceania Cups, winning three golds and two silvers from 2011 to 2019.

Lynch appeared in the 2016 Summer Olympics in Rio de Janeiro.

During first season of the FIH Pro League, Lynch reached a career milestone, becoming the most capped goalkeeper to play for the Australian national team, a record previously set at 207 caps by Rachel Imison.

In December 2020, the Hockeyroos selection panel dropped Lynch from the national squad for 2021. This move angered many in the Australian hockey community, and essentially ended Lynch's career just 12 months after she won the FIH Goalkeeper of the Year award.

In April 2021, Lynch won her appeal and returned to the hockeyroos.

In June 2021, Lynch was selected as the keeper to represent Australia in the Tokyo 2020 Olympics.  She discusses in a podcast details of the time between being dropped, and making it back!

The Hockeyroos lost 1-0 to India in the quarterfinals and therefore were not in medal contention.

Recognition
Since the introduction of the Goalkeeping Award in the FIH Player of the Year Awards in 2014, Lynch has been nominated on three occasions.

In 2019, Lynch won the award for the first time.

References

External links
 
 
 

1986 births
Living people
Australian female field hockey players
Field hockey players at the 2014 Commonwealth Games
Field hockey players at the 2016 Summer Olympics
Olympic field hockey players of Australia
Commonwealth Games medallists in field hockey
Commonwealth Games gold medallists for Australia
Female field hockey goalkeepers
Sportswomen from Victoria (Australia)
Field hockey players at the 2020 Summer Olympics
People from Warrandyte, Victoria
Field hockey players from Melbourne
21st-century Australian women
Medallists at the 2014 Commonwealth Games